Whitmore is a village and small curacy in the county of Staffordshire, England, near Newcastle-under-Lyme.

The name Whitmore can be found in the Domesday book (as Witemore) and also when King John signed Magna Carta at Runnymede.

Whitmore Hall, designated a house of outstanding architectural and historical interest  and a fine example of a small Carolean-style manor house, is the home of the Cavenagh-Mainwaring family.

See also
Listed buildings in Whitmore, Staffordshire

References

External links

Villages in Staffordshire
Borough of Newcastle-under-Lyme